Niphopyralis myrmecophila is a moth in the family Crambidae. It was described by Roepke in 1916. It is found in Indonesia (Java).

The wingspan is about 22 mm. Adults are glossy snow-white, the forewings with indistinct black markings.

Larvae have been recorded living in the nests of ants of the genus Oecophylla.

References

Moths described in 1916
Crambidae